Infinity is the fourth studio album by American rock band Journey, released in January 1978 by Columbia Records. It was the band's first album with vocalist Steve Perry and the last to feature drummer Aynsley Dunbar.

Background 
Looking for a stronger lead vocalist, Journey briefly enlisted Robert Fleischman and even recorded a few tracks with him, one of which, "For You", later appeared on the Time3 compilation album and Fleischman's solo album Perfect Stranger. Fleischman was soon replaced by Steve Perry, due to musical and management differences. Fleischman would later resurface as the first singer of the glam metal band Vinnie Vincent Invasion.

In "Feeling That Way", Perry dueted with keyboardist Gregg Rolie, who sings lead vocals on "Anytime".

"Patiently" was the first song Perry and Neal Schon wrote together. Perry wrote the lyrics, in which he expresses the sadness of being on the road and away from home, while also expressing admiration for the band's fans, and Schon wrote the music for the song. Other popular singles included "Lights" and "Wheel in the Sky". The latter was co-written with temporary frontman Fleischman.

Journey's manager, Herbie Herbert, enlisted English producer Roy Thomas Baker to produce Infinity. Baker produced a layered sound approach, similar to his work with Queen, as demonstrated on tracks such as "Winds of March" (with help from engineer Geoff Workman). In addition, Baker's method of stacked harmonies, notable on several other albums he produced, became trademarks of Journey's sound. He achieved this by having each vocalist (usually Perry and Rolie, sometimes joined by Valory and/or Schon) sing each harmony part in unison. This had the effect of making three or four voices sound like more, and is notable on the songs "Feeling that Way" and "Anytime", which are often played in tandem consecutively on radio stations as presented on the album.

The addition of Perry gave the band a more mainstream sound, and helped Journey attain their highest chart success to date.

Reception 

In John Franck's AllMusic review, he wrote that the album, "effectively cemented their rep as one of America's most beloved (and sometimes hated) commercial rock/pop bands." The changes to the band and its music allowed "each bandmember to play to his strength: Perry's soaring, whale of a voice, Schon's scorching fret work, and Gregg Rolie's subtle keyboard arrangements," he said. 

Cash Box said of the single "Anytime" that it is a "dynamic, irresistible effort that features exuberant, multi-tracked harmonies and potent lead guitar." Record World said of "Anytime" that "The a capella opening and high harmonies are guaranteed to catch the listener within seconds."

Track listing

Personnel 
Journey
Steve Perry – lead vocals
Neal Schon – electric and acoustic guitars, backing vocals
Gregg Rolie – keyboards, backing and co-lead (2 & 3) vocals 
Ross Valory – bass guitar, backing vocals
Aynsley Dunbar – drums, percussion

Production
Roy Thomas Baker – producer, mixing
Geoff Workman – engineering
John Golden – mastering
Tommy Steele – design
Alton Kelley, Stanley Mouse – artwork
Sam Emerson – photography
Mark Linett, Greg Schafer – technicians

Charts 
 

Album

Singles
Wheel in the Sky

Anytime

Lights

Certifications

References

Sources

Journey (band) albums
1978 albums
Columbia Records albums
Albums produced by Roy Thomas Baker